Gade (Gede) is a Nupoid language of Nigeria. Glottolog 4.7 (2022) classifies it as an independent branch of Benue-Congo rather than as a Nupoid language.

There exist northern and southern dialects of Gade, which are mutually comprehensible.

Distribution
Ethnologue lists the following locations:
Federal Capital Territory: Abuja Municipal Area Council and Kuje LGA
Nasarawa State: Nasarawa town, Toto LGA, and New Karshi in Karu LGA

References

Nupoid languages